Keya may refer to:

Kolya, Iran, a village in Mazandaran Province
Keya Creek (Chinese: 客雅溪; pinyin: Kèyǎ Xī), a creek in northern Taiwan
KEYA, a National Public Radio member public radio station in Belcourt, North Dakota
Atanas Keya, a Kenyan politician
Keya (actress), a Bangladeshi actress
Keya Group, a Bangladesh conglomerate

See also
Keya Paha County, Nebraska